Type 53 may refer to:
 Bugatti Type 53, motor vehicle produced by the auto-maker Bugatti
 Bristol Type 53, an experimental British military aircraft first flown in 1922
 Cadillac Type 53, motor vehicle produced by the auto-maker Cadillac
 Type 53 torpedo, a Russian torpedo
 Type 53 carbine, a Chinese version of the Mosin–Nagant
 Type 53 machine gun, a Chinese version of the Degtyaryov machine gun
 Type 53 heavy machine gun, a Chinese version of the SG-43 Goryunov
 Type 53 82mm mortar, a Chinese version of the 82-BM-37
 Type 53 120mm mortar, a Chinese version of the 120-PM-43 mortar
 Tarasque Type 53 T2, a 20 mm anti-aircraft gun adopted by the French Army